Jean-Louis Thiériot (born 26 June 1969) is a French lawyer, essayist and Member of the french Parliament for the right-wing parliamentary group Les Républicains (Republican). Mayor of Beauvoir from 2008 to 2018, he had been President of the Conseil Départemental de Seine-et-Marne in 2018 and is still Conseiller Départemental du Canton de Nangis. He has been French MP for Seine-et-Marne since 2018 and a member of the Defense Commission.

Political career 
At the 2017 French legislative election, Galbadon was the substitute candidate for Yves Jégo in Seine-et-Marne's 3rd constituency. Thiériot became a member of the National Assembly following Jégo's resignation from parliament due to his retirement from politics.
Very active on regalian issues, the french MP is a member of the National Defense and Armed Forces Commission (Commission de la défense nationale et des forces armées) and the rapporteur of two flash missions on the Defense Industrial and Technological Base (Base industrielle et technologique de défense, BITD) : he is also vice-chairman of the Commission of Inquiry into the state of the defence industry in the framework of the recovery plan (Commission d'enquête relative à l'état des lieux, la déontologie, les pratiques et les doctrines de maintien de l'ordre) and another about the financing of the BITD. He is also vice-chairman of the Commission of Inquiry into the state of play, ethics, practices and doctrines of law enforcement (Commission d'enquête relative à l'état des lieux, la déontologie, les pratiques et les doctrines de maintien de l'ordre).

He was auditor of the 29th national session "security and justice" (2017-2018, Promotion Colonel Arnaud Beltrame) of the National Institute of Higher Studies of Security and Justice (INHESJ) and auditor of the 72nd session "defense policy" of the IHEDN (Institut Des Hautes Études de Défense Nationale).

Education and Bibliography 

Graduated of Sciences Po Paris, Jean-Louis Thiériot holds a post-graduate degree (DEA) in history and a post-graduate diploma (DESS) in European business law. Economically liberal, he has notably written a biography of Margaret Thatcher, which won the Grand Prix de la biographie politique, as well as a book about the french President General de Gaulle : De Gaulle, le dernier réformateur.

Winner of the Prix Robert-Christophe de l'Association des écrivains combattants, his book on Stauffenberg illustrates his interest in Germany and his German-speaking skills. He also wrote France-Allemagne, l'heure de vérité, with Bernard de Montferrand (former French Ambassador in Berlin). Jean-Louis Thiériot is also a member of the French-German Parliamentary Assembly (AFPA).

He regularly compares the political systems on both sides of the Rhine in articles published by Le Figaro. Recently. He recently published "L’efficacité de l’Allemagne contre le virus contredit l’argument du manque de moyens".

References

External links 
 Biography at the French Parliament
http://www.generation-entreprise.fr/jeanlouis-thieriot

Living people
1969 births
21st-century French politicians
Politicians from Paris
Deputies of the 15th National Assembly of the French Fifth Republic
The Republicans (France) politicians
People from Seine-et-Marne
Deputies of the 16th National Assembly of the French Fifth Republic